Bonavista—Trinity—Conception was a federal electoral district in Newfoundland and Labrador, Canada, that was represented in the House of Commons of Canada from 1968 to 2003.

This riding was created in 1966 from parts of Bonavista—Twillingate and Trinity—Conception  ridings.
It was abolished in 2003 when it was redistributed into Avalon, Bonavista—Exploits and Random—Burin—St. George's ridings.

It initially consisted of the provincial districts of Trinity North, Trinity South, Bay de Verde, Carbonear, Harbour Grace and Port de Grave, and part of the provincial district of Bonavista South.

Members of Parliament

This riding elected the following Members of Parliament:

Election results

See also 

 List of Canadian federal electoral districts
 Past Canadian electoral districts

External links 
 Riding history for Bonavista—Trinity—Conception (1966–2003) from the Library of Parliament

Former federal electoral districts of Newfoundland and Labrador